Godzisław  (German Glasenapp) is a village in the administrative district of Gmina Grzmiąca, within Szczecinek County, West Pomeranian Voivodeship, in north-western Poland.

See also
 History of Pomerania

References

Villages in Szczecinek County